Heemskerk is a municipality and a town in the Netherlands, in the province of North Holland. It is located in the Kennemerland region.

Local government
As of March 2022, the municipal council of Heemskerk consists of 25 seats, which are divided as follows:

 Heemskerk Lokaal - 9 seats
 Liberaal Heemskerk - 3 seats
 Democrats 66 - 3 seats
 Green Left - 3 seats
 People's Party for Freedom and Democracy - 3 seats
 Labour Party - 2 seats
 Christian Democratic Appeal - 2 seats

The CDA, Heemskerk Lokaal, Liberaal Heemskerk and D66 form the governing coalition. The (non-elected) mayor of Heemskerk is currently K.S. Heldoorn (Labour Party).

History
It is not certain where the name of Heemskerk comes from. The town was already known during the Middle Ages. In an official deed from the year of 1063, the town was known as Hemezen Kyrica, Latinized Frisian meaning Church of Hemezen, a Frisian nun who lived in a religious house there. Heemskerk knows many historical monuments, among them the Huldtoneel (lit. the "Inaugurate Stage"), an artificial hill located near the current Rijksstraatweg, where once the Counts of Holland were inaugurated. According to tradition, the Huldtoneel was used before the Roman Era as a Germanic sanctuary. In the nineteenth century Jonkheer Gevers finally made the Huldtoneel a monument - as it is known today - and ordered passers-by to honour the monument.

Many battles have been fought in Heemskerk. Two castles - Oud Haerlem Castle and Heemskerk Castle - were built in the twelfth and thirteenth century respectively to protect the County of Holland against the West Frisians. In the fifteenth century the residents of Heemskerk fought each other during the Hook and Cod wars, in which both castles were destroyed. The Oud Haerlem castle was never rebuilt, Castle Heemskerk however was. In 1492 a rebellion by the people of Kennemerland was brutally beaten down by the Austrian conquerors, on the place where today the cemetery of the Hervormde Kerk (Reformed Church) is located.

In 1610 the Castle Heemskerk was renamed to Castle Marquette and was at first the residence for many nobles and later inhabited by patricians. The last noble family that lived there were the House of Gevers. Today Castle Marquette is owned by the Spanish hotelgroup NH Hoteles and is the site of many weddings, conferences, and company courses, while the estate grounds are favoured for wedding photos.

Located on the eastside of Heemskerk is Castle Assumburg, built from the remains of Kasteel Oud Haerlem in 1546. The Nederlandse Hervormde Kerk (Dutch Reformed Church) at the Nielenplein and Kerkplein is built in 1628, but it has a tower from the Middle Ages. In the graveyard around the church is a copy of a monument dedicated to the father of painter Maarten van Heemskerck. The original is located inside the church.

Agricultural village

After the time of knights and nobles, Heemskerk remained a small, quiet village near the dunes. Its residents, who mainly worked in agriculture and keeping cattle, had good, but also some very bad times. From the time that products - mainly strawberries for the neighbouring town Beverwijk, where the fruits were sold - were brought to the market with donkeys, people from Heemskerk got the name of Donkey as a nickname and symbol.

The former town hall was built in 1911 after a design by Jan Stuyt and was raised with an additional floor in 1949. Today this is the building where Janssen's notary office is located. The Roman Catholic Laurentiuskerk, designed by architect J.H. Tonnaer, was completed in 1891 and is a rare example of a Catholic church in Holland in a neo-renaissance style. There is nothing left of other historical monuments, like Castle Oud Haerlem.

Transportation
Railway Station: Heemskerk

Notable residents

 Maarten van Heemskerck (1498-1574) a Dutch portrait and religious painter
 Nicholaas Hennemann (1813-1898) early photographer who worked with William Henry Fox Talbot
 Rolf de Heer (born 1951) a Dutch Australian film director
 Nico Roozen (born 1953) an economist, co-launched fairtrade Max Havelaar with Solidaridad
 André Aptroot (born 1961) a Dutch mycologist and lichenologist
 Sofie van den Enk (born 1980) a Dutch TV presenter
 Bette Franke, (born 1989) a Dutch model

Sport 
 Martin van der Horst (born 1965) a retired volleyball player, team silver medallist at the 1992 Summer Olympics
 Ernesto Hoost (born 1965) a retired kickboxer: four-time K-1 World Champion
 Arthur Numan (born 1969) a retired Dutch footballer with 436 club caps 
 Juan Viedma (born 1974) a Dutch retired footballer with 232 club caps
 Dennis Lens (born 1977) a Dutch former badminton player, competed at the 2000 Summer Olympics
 Rafael van der Vaart (born 1983) primarily known as a retired footballer with 417 club caps and currently a professional darts player 
 Nick Kuipers (born 1988) a Dutch footballer with 230 club caps

Gallery

References

External links

Official website 

 
Municipalities of North Holland
Populated places in North Holland